Grigorovich DI-3, (Dvukhmyestnyi Istrebitel - two-seat fighter), was a prototype two-seat fighter developed in the Soviet Union in the 1930s. It was intended to be a long-range escort fighter developed from the DI-2 with improved range and performance comparable to single-seat fighter aircraft of the time. DI-3 was a single-bay biplane of mixed construction with a twin-rudder tailplane of variable incidence. Although initial tests demonstrated flight characteristics comparable to Polikarpov I-5, the addition of armament and operational equipment caused significant degradation in performance and DI-3 did not enter mass production. The prototype was subsequently fitted with an enclosed cockpit and used as a VIP transport.

Specifications (DI-3)

References

Grigorovich aircraft
1930s Soviet fighter aircraft